Hakeem Achour (born 31 May 1989) is a French footballer.

References

External links

Living people
1989 births
French footballers
Association football wingers
Association football midfielders
Association football forwards
French sportspeople of Algerian descent
Ligue 1 players
Ligue 2 players
Championnat National players
Championnat National 2 players
Algerian Ligue Professionnelle 1 players
US Ivry players
Villemomble Sports players
Sainte-Geneviève Sports players
Football Club 93 Bobigny-Bagnolet-Gagny players
JA Drancy players
Dijon FCO players
ÉFC Fréjus Saint-Raphaël players
JS Saoura players
ES Viry-Châtillon players